The 2015 Men's Indoor Hockey Asia Cup was the 6th edition of the Indoor Hockey Asia Cup specifically for men. It was held in Korgan City, Kazakhstan from 13–17 May 2015.

The number of teams for this year’s cup are the same as for the previous tournament where five teams competed. Malaysia, Chinese Taipei and Indonesia, who competed previously did not join this year’s edition and were replaced by Qatar, Tajikistan and Uzbekistan.

Iran defeated Kazakhstan in the final to win the cup.

Participating nations
Five countries are participating in this year's tournament:

 (Host)

Umpires

 Sean Edwards (ENG)
 Makhsudbek Urmanov (KAZ)
 Ahmad Kazemi (IRI)
 Karimov Ruslan (UZB)
 Kamran Shah (QAT)
 Stirling Sharpe (AUS)

Results
All times are in East Kazakhstan Standard Time (UTC+06:00).

Pool

Classification

Bronze medal

Final

Final standings

References

External links
FIH

Indoor Hockey Asia Cup
Indoor Hockey Asia Cup
Asia Cup
International sports competitions hosted by Kazakhstan
Indoor Hockey Asia Cup Men